Carphoides is a genus of moths in the family Geometridae.

Species
 Carphoides inconspicuaria (Barnes & McDunnough, 1916)
 Carphoides incopriaria (Hulst, 1887)
 Carphoides setigera Rindge, 1958

References
 Carphoides at Markku Savela's Lepidoptera and Some Other Life Forms
 Natural History Museum Lepidoptera genus database

Melanolophiini
Geometridae genera